The Vélodrome National de Saint-Quentin-en-Yvelines is a velodrome in Montigny-le-Bretonneux, France. It was built between 2011 and 2014 and hosted the 2015 UCI Track Cycling World Championships and 2016 UEC European Track Championships. It will host the cycling venue in the 2024 Summer Olympics.

Next to the velodrome is also a BMX stadium.

Velodromes in France
Sports venues in Yvelines
Sports venues completed in 2014
2014 establishments in France
BMX tracks
Venues of the 2024 Summer Olympics
Olympic cycling venues
Olympic modern pentathlon venues
21st-century architecture in France